Folipastatin is a depsidone phospholipase A2 inhibitor which is produced by the fungi Aspergillus unguis and Wicklowia aquatica. Folipastatin has the molecular formula C23H24O5.

References

Further reading 

 

Aspergillus
Oxygen heterocycles
Heterocyclic compounds with 3 rings
Phenols
Benzodioxepines